Nils Åkerlindh (31 March 1913 – 23 April 1992) was a Swedish wrestler. He competed in the men's freestyle heavyweight at the 1936 Summer Olympics.

References

External links
 

1913 births
1992 deaths
Swedish male sport wrestlers
Olympic wrestlers of Sweden
Wrestlers at the 1936 Summer Olympics
Sportspeople from Stockholm
20th-century Swedish people